Zimex Aviation Ltd. is an airline based in Glattbrugg, Switzerland. It provides aircraft leases worldwide to the oil and mining industries and to humanitarian organizations. Its main base is at Oued Irara - Krim Belkacem Airport which is an airport serving Hassi Messaoud, a city in the Ouargla Province of eastern Algeria.

History 
The airline was established and started operations in 1969.

On October 14, 1987, a Lockheed L-100-30 - a civilian variant of the military transport plane C-130 Hercules - was shot down in Angola. It was operated on behalf of the International Committee of the Red Cross.

In October 1999, Zimex Aviation Group was sold to a Swiss investor group.

Fleet 
The Zimex Aviation fleet comprises the following aircraft (as of August 2016):

At the July 2010 Farnborough Air Show, Zimex took delivery of the first DHC-6 Twin Otter Series 400 produced by Viking Air.

References

External links

Zimex Aviation

Airlines of Switzerland
Airlines established in 1969
Swiss companies established in 1969
Opfikon
Companies based in the canton of Zürich